Sivan Fahima (or Pahima, ; born 7 September 1983)  is an Israeli football player. She plays as a defender for the Israeli national team. She had also played in for Maccabi Holon in the 2003–04 UEFA Women's Cup.

Club career
Fahima started her career in Maccabi Haifa until the team folded in 2003 and Fahima transferred to Maccabi Holon, where she played until 2014, when she moved to F.C. Kiryat Gat.

Throughout her career, Fahima won  6 championships and 11 cups, scoring a total of six goals in cup finals, including a hat-trick in 2009 cup final. Fahima was joint top scorer in the 2012–13 cup, scoring 4 goals throughout the competition.

International career
Fahima made her international debut for Israel women's national football team in 2001 against Estonia and played a total of 19 matches for the national team, scoring two goals. Fahima's last match was on 26 August 2007, also against Estonia. Fahima also played for the U-19 national team, making six appearances and scoring two goals, all during 2002 UEFA Women's Under-19 Championship qualifying tournament.

Honours
Championships (6):
With Maccabi Haifa: 2001–02
With Maccabi Holon: 2004–05 , 2005–06, 2006–07, 2007–08, 2008–09
Cup (11):
With Maccabi Haifa: 1998–99, 1999–2000, 2001–02
With Maccabi Holon: 2003–04, 2004–05, 2005–06, 2006–07, 2007–08, 2008–09, 2009–10, 2012–13

References

External links

Israeli Jews
Living people
1983 births
Israeli women's footballers
Israel women's international footballers
Maccabi Haifa F.C. (women) players
Maccabi Holon F.C. (women) players
F.C. Kiryat Gat (women) players
Women's association football defenders
Footballers from Ashkelon